BOS 400 is a French derrick/lay barge that ran aground while being towed by the Russian tugboat Tigr on June 26, 1994.

Tigr was chartered to tow BOS 400 from Pointe-Noire in the Republic of Congo to Cape Town, South Africa. The tow-rope broke loose during a huge storm and caused the vessel to run aground off Duiker Point near Sandy Bay, at the same place as the earlier wreck of the SS Oakburn.

Despite several towage attempts, the shipwreck was considered a total loss as salvors were able to recover little from the wreck.  BOS 400 remains a wreck today, with a large crane and part of the superstructure visible above sea level.  The wreck is slowly disintegrating.

Tigr was built in 1987 in Polish shipyards. Following the accident, she remained idle in the Cape Town docks from 1994 to 2000, when she was sold for $625,000.

References

External links
 
 

BOS 400
Maritime incidents in 1994
Maritime incidents in South Africa